Krest-Khaldzhay (Kiries Xalcaayı) is a rural locality (a selo), the administrative centre of and one of three settlements, in addition to Ary-Tolon and Udarnik, in Bayagantaysky Rural Okrug of Tomponsky District in the Sakha Republic, Russia. Its population as of the 2002 Census was 1,513.

Climate

Notable residents 

 Fyodor Okhlopkov - a Soviet sniper during World War II, credited with 429 kills.

References

Notes

Sources
Official website of the Sakha Republic. Registry of the Administrative-Territorial Divisions of the Sakha Republic. Tomponsky District. 

Rural localities in Tomponsky District